After Class may refer to:
After Class (film), a 2019 American comedy-drama film
After Class (group), a Hong Kong Cantopop girl group